The Gonatozygaceae are one of four families of Charophyte green algae in the order Desmidiales (desmids).

Genera
, AlgaeBase accepted two genera:
 Genicularina Molinari & Guiry
 Gonatozygon De Bary (syn. Leptocystinema)
Genicularia is an illegitimate name for Genicularina.

References

External links

Zygnematophyceae families
Desmidiales